Antonio "Toni" González Rodríguez (born 7 January 1982) is a Spanish retired footballer who played as an attacking midfielder.

Football career
Born in Albacete, Castile-La Mancha, González made his professional debuts with RCD Mallorca in the 2003–04 season, playing in La Liga with the club and adding seven appearances in the campaign's UEFA Cup, scoring in away wins against APOEL FC (2–1) and FC Spartak Moscow (3–0) as the Balearic Islands side reached the last-16.

Subsequently, González spent several seasons loaned, with Ciudad de Murcia in the second division and Real Oviedo in the third. Released by Mallorca in 2006 he moved to Greece, playing with PAOK FC in the Superleague and three teams in the second level, achieving promotion in the latter competition in 2011 with Doxa Drama FC.

References

External links

1982 births
Living people
Sportspeople from Albacete
Spanish footballers
Footballers from Castilla–La Mancha
Association football midfielders
La Liga players
Segunda División players
Segunda División B players
RCD Mallorca B players
RCD Mallorca players
Ciudad de Murcia footballers
Real Oviedo players
Super League Greece players
Football League (Greece) players
PAOK FC players
Ionikos F.C. players
Doxa Drama F.C. players
Athlitiki Enosi Larissa F.C. players
AEL Kalloni F.C. players
Spanish expatriate footballers
Expatriate footballers in Greece
Spanish expatriate sportspeople in Greece